Pelitözü can refer to:

 Pelitözü, Bilecik
 Pelitözü, Kargı
 Pelitözü, Mudurnu